Fairview, also known as the Mayor James Moore House, is a historic home located in Appoquinimink Hundred, southeast of Odessa, New Castle County, Delaware.  It was built about 1773, and is a two-story, single pile brick dwelling in the Georgian style.  It has a gable roof, original rear kitchen ell, and has a center-passage plan.

It was listed on the National Register of Historic Places in 1984.

References

External links
 J. Moore Farmstead, Corncrib, East side of Route 13, south of Odessa, Odessa, New Castle County, DE: 2 photos, 2 data pages, and 1 photo caption page at Historic American Buildings Survey

Houses on the National Register of Historic Places in Delaware
Georgian architecture in Delaware
Houses completed in 1773
Houses in New Castle County, Delaware
National Register of Historic Places in New Castle County, Delaware